Allers is a surname. Notable people with the surname include:

 Arthur Allers (1875–1961), Norwegian sailor
 Christian Wilhelm Allers (1857–1915), German painter and artist
 Frank Allers, Canadian road racer
 Franz Allers, European-American conductor
 Roger Allers (born 1949), American animation director, screenwriter, playwright, animator and storyboard artist
 Christopher Allers (born 1963), mental health researcher, non-profit organization expert

See also 
 Aller (surname)